IT security standards or cyber security standards are techniques generally outlined in published materials that attempt to protect the cyber environment of a user or organization. This environment includes users themselves, networks, devices, all software, processes, information in storage or transit, applications, services, and systems that can be connected directly or indirectly to networks. 

The principal objective is to reduce the risks, including preventing or mitigating cyber-attacks. These published materials consist of tools, policies, security concepts, security safeguards, guidelines, risk management approaches, actions, training, best practices, assurance and technologies.

History
Cybersecurity standards have existed over several decades as users and providers have collaborated in many domestic and international forums to effect the necessary capabilities, policies, and practices – generally emerging from work at the Stanford Consortium for Research on Information Security and Policy in the 1990s.

A 2016 US security framework adoption study reported that 70% of the surveyed organizations the NIST Cybersecurity Framework as the most popular best practice for Information Technology (IT) computer security, but many note that it requires significant investment. Cross-border, cyber-exfiltration operations by law enforcement agencies to counter international criminal activities on the dark web raise complex jurisdictional questions that remain, to some extent, unanswered. Tensions between domestic law enforcement efforts to conduct cross-border cyber-exfiltration operations and international jurisdiction are likely to continue to provide improved cybersecurity norms.

International Standards 
The subsections below detail international standards related to cybersecurity.

ISO/IEC 27001 and 27002 

ISO/IEC 27001, part of the growing ISO/IEC 27000 family of standards, is an information security management system (ISMS) standard, of which the last revision was published in October 2022 by the International Organization for Standardization (ISO) and the International Electrotechnical Commission (IEC). Its full name is ISO/IEC 27001:2022 – Information security, cybersecurity and privacy protection - Information security management systems - Requirements.

ISO/IEC 27001 formally specifies a management system intended to bring information security under explicit management control.

ISO/IEC 27002 incorporates part 1 of the BS 7799 good security management practice standard. The latest version of BS 7799 is BS 7799-3. Sometimes ISO/IEC 27002 is therefore referred to as ISO 17799 or BS 7799 part 1 and, sometimes it refers to part 1 and part 7. BS 7799 part 1 provides an outline or good practice guide for cybersecurity management; whereas  BS 7799 part 2 and ISO/IEC 27001 are normative and therefore provide a framework for certification. ISO/IEC 27002 is a high-level guide to cybersecurity. It is most beneficial as explanatory guidance for the management of an organisation to obtain certification to the ISO/IEC 27001 standard. The certification once obtained lasts three years. Depending on the auditing organisation, no or some intermediate audits may be carried out during the three years.

ISO/IEC 27001 (ISMS) replaces  BS 7799 part 2, but since it is backwards compatible any organization working toward BS 7799 part 2 can easily transition to the ISO/IEC 27001 certification process. There is also a transitional audit available to make it easier once an organization is BS 7799 part 2-certified for the organization to become ISO/IEC 27001-certified. ISO/IEC 27002 provides best practice recommendations on information security management for use by those responsible for initiating, implementing or maintaining information security management systems (ISMS). It states the information security systems required to implement ISO/IEC 27002 control objectives. Without ISO/IEC 27001, ISO/IEC 27002 control objectives are ineffective. ISO/IEC 27002 controls objectives are incorporated into ISO 27001 in Annex A.

ISO/IEC 21827 (SSE-CMM – ISO/IEC 21827) is an International Standard based on the Systems Security Engineering Capability Maturity Model (SSE-CMM) that can measure the maturity of ISO controls objectives.

ISO/IEC 15408

This standard develops what is called the “Common Criteria.” It allows many different software and hardware products to be integrated and tested in a secure way.

IEC 62443 

The IEC 62443 cybersecurity standard defines processes, techniques and requirements for Industrial Automation and Control Systems (IACS). Its documents are the result of the IEC standards creation process where all national committees involved agree upon a common standard.

 All IEC 62443 standards and technical reports are organized into four general categories called General, Policies and Procedures, System and Component.

 The first category includes foundational information such as concepts, models and terminology. 
 The second category of work products targets the Asset Owner. These address various aspects of creating and maintaining an effective IACS security program.
 The third category includes work products that describe system design guidelines and requirements for the secure integration of control systems. Core in this is the zone and conduit, design model.
 The fourth category includes work products that describe the specific product development and technical requirements of control system products.

ISO/SAE 21434
ISO/SAE 21434 "Road vehicles - Cybersecurity engineering" is a cybersecurity standard jointly developed by ISO and SAE working groups. It proposes cybersecurity measures for the development lifecycle of road vehicles. The standard was published in August 2021.

The standard is related to the European Union (EU) regulation on cyber security that is currently being developed. In coordination with the EU, the UNECE is developing a certification for a "Cyber Security Management System" (CSMS), which is to be mandatory for the type approval of vehicles. ISO/SAE 21434 is a technical standard for automotive development that can demonstrate compliance with those regulations.

A derivative of this is in the work of UNECE WP29, which provides regulations for vehicle cybersecurity and software updates.

ETSI EN 303 645
The ETSI EN 303 645 standard provides a set of baseline requirements for security in consumer Internet of things (IoT) devices. It contains technical controls and organizational policies for developers and manufacturers of Internet-connected consumer devices. The standard was released in June 2020 and is intended to be complemented by other, more specific standards. As many consumer IoT devices handle personally identifiable information (PII), implementing the standard helps with complying to the General Data Protection Regulation (GDPR) in the EU.

The Cybersecurity provisions in this European standard are:
 No universal default passwords 
 Implement a means to manage reports of vulnerabilities 
 Keep software updated 
 Securely store sensitive security parameters 
 Communicate securely 
 Minimize exposed attack surfaces 
 Ensure software integrity 
 Ensure that personal data is secure 
 Make systems resilient to outages 
 Examine system telemetry data 
 Make it easy for users to delete user data 
 Make installation and maintenance of devices easy 
 Validate input data

Conformance assessment of these baseline requirements is via the standard TS 103 701, which allows self-certification, or certification by another group.

National Standards 
The subsections below detail national standards and frameworks related to cybersecurity.

NERC
An initial attempt to create information security standards for the electrical power industry was created by NERC in 2003 and was known as NERC CSS (Cyber Security Standards). Subsequent to the CSS guidelines, NERC evolved and enhanced those requirements.  The most widely recognized modern NERC security standard is NERC 1300, which is a modification/update of NERC 1200. The newest version of NERC 1300 is called CIP-002-3 through CIP-009-3 (CIP=Critical Infrastructure Protection). These standards are used to secure bulk electric systems although NERC has created standards within other areas. The bulk electric system standards also provide network security administration while still supporting best-practice industry processes.

NIST

 The NIST Cybersecurity Framework (NIST CSF) "provides a high level taxonomy of cybersecurity outcomes and a methodology to assess and manage those outcomes." It is intended to help private sector organizations that provide critical infrastructure with guidance on how to protect it, along with relevant protections for privacy and civil liberties.
 Special publication 800-12 provides a broad overview of computer security and control areas. It also emphasizes the importance of security controls and ways to implement them. Initially, this document was aimed at the federal government although most practices in this document can be applied to the private sector as well. Specifically, it was written for those people in the federal government responsible for handling sensitive systems. 
 Special publication 800-14 describes common security principles that are used. It provides a high-level description of what should be incorporated within a computer security policy. It describes what can be done to improve existing security as well as how to develop a new security practice.  Eight principles and fourteen practices are described within this document. 
 Special publication 800-26 provides advice on how to manage IT security.  Superseded by NIST SP 800-53 rev3.  This document emphasizes the importance of self-assessments as well as risk assessments.  
 Special publication 800-37, updated in 2010 provides a new risk approach: "Guide for Applying the Risk Management Framework to Federal Information Systems"
 Special publication 800-53 rev4, "Security and Privacy Controls for Federal Information Systems and Organizations", Published April 2013 updated to include updates as of January 15, 2014, specifically addresses the 194 security controls that are applied to a system to make it "more secure".
 Special publication 800-63-3, "Digital Identity Guidelines", Published June 2017 updated to include updates as of December 1, 2017, provides guidelines for implementing digital identity services, including identity proofing, registration, and authentication of users. 
 Special Publication 800-82, Revision 2, "Guide to Industrial Control System (ICS) Security", revised May 2015, describes how to secure multiple types of Industrial Control Systems against cyber-attacks while considering the performance, reliability and safety requirements specific to ICS.

FIPS 140 

The 140 series of Federal Information Processing Standards (FIPS) are U.S. government computer security standards that specify requirements for cryptography modules. Both FIPS 140-2 and FIPS 140-3 are accepted as current and active.

Cyber Essentials 

Cyber Essentials is a United Kingdom government information assurance scheme that is operated by the National Cyber Security Centre (NCSC). It encourages organizations to adopt good practice in information security. Cyber Essentials also includes an assurance framework and a simple set of security controls to protect information from threats coming from the internet.

Essential Eight 
The Australian Cyber Security Centre has developed prioritised mitigation strategies, in the form of the Strategies to Mitigate Cyber Security Incidents, to help organisations protect themselves against various cyber threats. The most effective of these mitigation strategies are called the Essential Eight.

BSI IT-Grundschutz
The Federal Office for Information Security (abbreviated as BSI) standards are an elementary component of the IT baseline protection methodology. They contain recommendations on methods, processes and procedures as well as approaches and measures for various aspects of information security. Users from public authorities and companies as well as manufacturers or service providers can use the BSI standards to make their business processes and data more secure.
 BSI Standard 100-4 covers Business Continuity Management (BCM).
 BSI Standard 200-1 defines general requirements for an information security management system (ISMS). It is compatible with ISO 27001 and considers recommendations of other ISO standards such as ISO 27002.
 BSI Standard 200-2 forms the basis of BSI's methodology for establishing a sound information security management system (ISMS). It establishes three procedures for implementing IT baseline protection.
 BSI Standard 200-3 bundles all risk-related steps in the implementation of IT baseline protection.

Industry-specific Standards 
The subsections below detail cybersecurity standards and frameworks related to specific industries.

PCI DSS 

The Payment Card Industry Data Security Standard (PCI DSS) is an information security standard for organizations that handle branded credit cards from the major card schemes. The PCI Standard is mandated by the card brands but administered by the Payment Card Industry Security Standards Council. The standard was created to increase controls around cardholder data to reduce credit card fraud.

UL 2900 
UL 2900 is a series of standards published by UL. The standards include general cybersecurity requirements (UL 2900-1) as well as specific requirements for medical products (UL 2900-2-1), industrial systems (UL 2900-2-2), and security and life safety signalling systems (UL 2900-2-3).

UL 2900 requires that manufacturers have described and documented the attack surface of the technologies used in their products. It requires threat modeling based on the intended use and deployment environment. The standard requires the implementation of effective security measures that protect sensitive (personal) data as well as other assets such as command and control data. It also requires that security vulnerabilities in the software have been eliminated, security principles such as defence-in-depth have been followed, and the security of the software has been verified through penetration testing.

See also
 Chief information security officer
 Computer security
 Control system security
 Information security
 Information assurance

Notes

References
Department of Homeland Security, A Comparison of Cyber Security Standards Developed by the Oil and Gas Segment. (November 5, 2004)
Guttman, M., Swanson, M., National Institute of Standards and Technology; Technology Administration; U.S. Department of Commerce., Generally Accepted Principles and Practices for Securing Information Technology Systems (800–14). (September 1996)
National Institute of Standards and Technology; Technology Administration; U.S. Department of Commerce., An Introduction to Computer Security: The NIST Handbook, Special Publication 800-12.
Swanson, M., National Institute of Standards and Technology; Technology Administration; U.S. Department of Commerce., Security Self-Assessment Guide for Information Technology Systems (800–26).
Grassi, P.; Garcia, M.; Fenton, J.;National Institute of Standards and Technology; U.S. Department of Commerce., Digital Identity Guidelines (800-63-3).
Stouffer, K.; Pillitteri, V.; Lightman, S.; Abrams, M.; Hahn, A.; National Institute of Standards and Technology; U.S. Department of Commerce., Guide to Industrial Control Systems (ICS) Security (800–82).
The North American Electric Reliability Council (NERC). http://www.nerc.com. Retrieved November 12, 2005.
Federal Financial Institutions Examination Council (FFIEC). https://www.ffiec.gov. Retrieved April 18, 2018.

External links
 IEC Cyber Security
 ISO 27001 Information Security
 NERC CIP Standards
 Presentation by Professor William Sanders, University of Illinois
 Global Cybersecurity Policy Conference
 A 10 Minute Guide to the NIST Cybersecurity Framework 
 Federal Financial Institutions Examination Council's (FFIEC) Web Site
CIS Critical Security Controls

Computer security standards
Cyberwarfare
Computer security procedures